Brachyderes lusitanicus, the pine weevil, is a species in the weevil family (Curculionidae). This weevil can reach a length around 8 mm. It occurs in Portugal, Spain, and France.

References
 Fauna Europaea
 EoL

Entiminae
Beetles described in 1781